Hóquei Clube de Sintra is a Rink Hockey team from Sintra, Portugal.

Achievements

National
Portuguese Roller Hockey First Division: 4
1948–49, 1949–50, 1957–58, 1958–59

Rink hockey clubs in Portugal